There are a number of times in which the canonical gospels describe Jesus Christ praying to God. 


Recorded prayers
The gospels record words that Jesus spoke in prayer:

Thanking God for his revelation (Matthew 11:25, Luke 10:21)
Before the raising of Lazarus (John 11:41-42)
"Father, glorify your name" (John 12:28)
His prayer in John 17
Three prayers in the Garden of Gethsemane
Three prayers on the cross:
"Father forgive them; for they know not what they do" (Luke 23:34)
"My God, My God, why hast thou forsaken me?" (Matt 27:46, Mark 15:34)
"Father, into thy hands I commit my spirit" (Luke 23:46)

Other references to Jesus praying
Other references to Jesus praying include:
At his baptism (Luke 3:21)
Regular time of withdrawal from the crowds (Luke 5:16)
After healing people in the evening (Mark 1:35)
Before walking on water (Matt 14:23, Mark 6:46, John 6:15)
Before choosing the Twelve (Luke 6:12)
Before Peter's confession (Luke 9:18)
At the Transfiguration (Luke 9:29)
Before teaching his disciples the Lord's Prayer (Luke 11:1)
Jesus says that he has prayed for Peter's faith (Luke 22:32)

In addition to this, Jesus said grace before the feeding miracles, at the Last Supper, and at the supper at Emmaus.

R. A. Torrey notes that Jesus prayed early in the morning as well as all night, that he prayed both before and after the great events of his life, and that he prayed "when life was unusually busy".

See also
Christian prayer

References

Life of Jesus in the New Testament
Christian prayer